The NZi3 Innovation Institute is a partnership between the New Zealand government and the University of Canterbury. It was formed in 2006 to commercialise the University's IT research and to develop high-tech industry in Canterbury. A large eco-friendly office building in the university grounds was completed early 2009.

The following university departments and companies are associated with NZi3:

HITLab NZ
Geospatial Research Centre
Wireless Research Centre

The NZi3 is also involved in the University's research in Nanotechnology, Assistive Technology, and Bioengineering.

External links
Official site

University of Canterbury